Chư Prông is a district (huyện) of Gia Lai province in the Central Highlands region of Vietnam.

As of 2003 the district had a population of 76,255. The district covers an area of  1,688 km². The district capital lies at Chư Prông.

References

Districts of Gia Lai province